Sieverne, renamed Pyatypillya in 2016, is an urban-type settlement in Snizhne Municipality, Horlivka Raion in Donetsk Oblast of eastern Ukraine. Popultion:

Demographics
Native language as of the Ukrainian Census of 2001:
 Ukrainian 19.09%
 Russian 80.58%
 Belarusian 0.14%
 Bulgarian and Moldovan 0.03%

References

Urban-type settlements in Horlivka Raion